Henry Maltby (1818 – 7 April 1869) was an English first-class cricketer active 1842–44 who played for Nottinghamshire. He was born in England and died in Blackheath. He played in five first-class matches.

References

1818 births
1869 deaths
English cricketers
Nottinghamshire cricketers
Gentlemen of Nottinghamshire cricketers